This is a list of masked wrestlers. The earliest known masked wrestler in the United States was The Masked Marvel who famously "crashed" the international tournament, which featured many of the top stars of the "Farmer" Burns-Frank Gotch era, held at the Manhattan Opera House in 1915. In North America, many professional wrestlers have traditionally worn masks after they had been used in an area, or "territory", that their popularity and drawing ability diminished, it would be an easy way for a wrestler to begin working in a new area as a "fresh face". Sometimes workers wore masks in one territory and unmasked in another territory in order to keep their two identities separate. Several wrestlers used one or two personas for their entire career such as The Destroyer (1962–1984), Mr. Wrestling (1965–1983) and Masked Superstar (1976–1986). Tony Atlas debuted as the Black Atlas in a feud with Randy Savage around 1976.

Wrestling masks also have a significant cultural importance in lucha libre, and puroresu to a lesser extent; famed luchadores such as Blue Demon, Mil Máscaras and El Santo have achieved an almost iconic status in Mexico. In Japan, masked wrestlers are also very popular. Many are heavily influenced by anime and manga characters such as Tiger Mask and Black Tiger during the 1980s, and Jushin Thunder Liger in the 90s. Many of these stars would appear in World Championship Wrestling during the "Monday Night Wars" period.

In recent years, World Wrestling Entertainment has re-used masked characters for comedic purposes. Edge and Christian donned the masks worn by the WWF's original Los Conquistadores in their feud with World Tag Team Champions The Hardy Boyz in 2000. Under the guise of El Gran Luchadore, Paul London, Shannon Moore, Eddie Guerrero and Kurt Angle each challenged JBL for the WWE Championship in 2004. Likewise, El Generico and Shark Boy play a similar role on the independent circuit.

List

Single wrestlers

Tag teams and stables

References

External links
 The History of the Mask, a brief history of masked wrestlers in lucha libre

Masked wrestlers